How Do You Live? may refer to:

 How Do You Live? (novel), a 1937 novel by Yoshino Genzaburo
 How Do You Live? (film), an upcoming Japanese animated film produced by Studio Ghibli, named after the 1937 novel